Itxassou or Itsasu is a railway station in Itxassou, Nouvelle-Aquitaine, France. The station was opened in 1891 and is located on the Bayonne - Saint-Jean-Pied-de-Port railway line. The station is served by TER (local) services operated by the SNCF. It was closed in 2019 and reopened in 2022.

References

Railway stations in France opened in 1891
Railway stations in Pyrénées-Atlantiques